The simple-station Calle 100 is part of the TransMilenio mass-transit system of Bogotá, Colombia, which opened in the year 2000.

Location

The station is located in northern Bogotá, specifically on the Autopista Norte with Calle 98.

History
After the opening of Portal de Usme in early 2001 the Autopista Norte line was opened, including this station. A few months later, Portal del Norte was opened, changing this station's line.

The station is named Calle 100 due to its proximity to the bridge which carries Avenida Calle 100 (also called Avenida España) over the Autopista Norte.

It serves the demand of the La Castellana and Chicó Norte III Sector neighborhoods, as well as the commercial and financial areas located on Calle 100 and Avenida Carrera 19.

On the night of April 9, 2013, attacks against this system station were recorded. On that occasion, the stations Calle 100 (TransMilenio), Calle 106 (TransMilenio), Prado, Alcalá, Calle 142 (TransMilenio), Calle 146 (TransMilenio), Mazurén (TransMilenio), Calle 161 (TransMilenio), Calle 187 (TransMilenio), and Terminal (TM) with Autopista Norte, where they left $ 22 million Weights in losses

Station Services

Old trunk services

Main line service

Feeder routes

This station does not have connections to feeder routes.

Inter-city service

This station does not have inter-city service.

External links
TransMilenio

See also
 Bogotá
 List of TransMilenio Stations
 TransMilenio

TransMilenio